Rhopalomeniidae is a family of solenogaster, a kind of shell-less, worm-like, marine mollusk.

Genera
 Dinomenia Nierstrasz, 1902
 Driomenia Heath, 1911
 Entonomenia Leloup, 1948
 Pruvotia Thiele, 1894
 Rhopalomenia Simroth, 1893
 Urgorria Garcia-Álvarez & Salvini-Plawen, 2001
Synonyms
 Rhopalomenia Simroth, 1893 (part) synonym of Entonomenia Leloup, 1948

References

 Salvini-Plawen L v. (1978). Antarktische und subantarktische Solenogastres (eine Monographie: 1898-1974). Zoologica (Stuttgart) 128: 1-305.
 García-Álvarez O. & Salvini-Plawen L.v. (2007). Species and diagnosis of the families and genera of Solenogastres (Mollusca). Iberus 25(2): 73-143
 García-Álvarez O., Salvini-Plawen L.v., Urgorri V. & Troncoso J.S. (2014). Mollusca. Solenogastres, Caudofoveata, Monoplacophora. Fauna Iberica. 38: 1-294

Solenogastres